The Constitution Alteration (State Debts) Bill 1928, was approved by referendum on 17 November 1928. The amendment to the Australian constitution concerned financial relations between the Commonwealth of Australia and the Australian states. It became law on 13 February 1929.

The purpose was to ensure the constitutionality of the Financial Agreement, which had been reached by the federal and all state governments in 1927. The agreement discontinued the per-capita payments system that had existed since 1910 and restricted the borrowing rights of the states by subjecting such borrowing to control by a Loan Council.

The referendum was held in conjunction with the 1928 federal election.

Overview
The financial relations between the Commonwealth of Australia and the states worsened during the 1920s. A financial settlement between the governments in 1910 had introduced "per capita grants", whereby each state received annual grants from the commonwealth of 25 shillings ($2.50) per head of its population. By the mid-1920s, inflation had made serious inroads into this sum but no new formula had been found.

The 1927 Financial Agreement, apart from establishing a new grants regime, provided for commonwealth assistance in state debt reduction and, most importantly, established the Loan Council. Henceforth all governmental borrowing, except for purposes of defence, was to be under Loan Council control. Due to doubts concerning the constitutionality of this new body, it was agreed that its legality would be put beyond doubt by the insertion of a new provision, Section 105A, into the Finance and Trade Chapter of the Constitution. The amendment was carried by a large majority of voters, and in all six states.

The Loan Council, described as "a unique institution among federations", attracted overseas attention from the moment of its birth:

if Australia has made a unique contribution to federal finance it lies in its harmonisation of public borrowing by an institutional device [i.e. the Loan Council] which offers a solution for a host of related federal problems-the co-ordination of public investment, economic planning, tax conflicts, and so on.

The Loan Council has had a dramatic impact on Commonwealth-State financial relations, particularly in helping the Commonwealth government oversee the national economy.

Question
Question: Do you approve of the proposed law for the alteration of the Constitution entitled 'Constitution Alteration (State Debts) 1928?

Changes to the text of the constitution
The proposal was to insert a new section 105A to read as follows:
(1.) The Commonwealth may make agreements with the States with respect to the public debts of the States, including-
1. the taking over of such debts by the Commonwealth;
2. the management of such debts;
3. the payment of interest and the provision and management of sinking funds in respect of such debts;
4. the consolidation, renewal, conversion and redemption of such debts;
5. the indemnification of the Commonwealth by the States in respect of debts taken over by the Commonwealth; and
6. the borrowing of money by the State or the Commonwealth, or by the Commonwealth for the States.

(2.) The Parliament may make laws for validating any such agreement made before the commencement of this section.
(3.) The Parliament may make laws for the carrying out by the parties thereto of any such agreement.
(4.) Any such agreement may be varied or rescinded by the parties thereto.
(5.) Every such agreement and any such variation thereof shall be binding upon the Commonwealth and the States parties thereto notwithstanding anything contained in this Constitution or the Constitution of the several States or in any law of the Parliament of the Commonwealth or of any State.
(6.) The powers conferred by this section shall not be construed as being limited in any way by the provisions of section one hundred and five of this Constitution.

Results
The referendum was approved by a majority of voters, and a majority of the voters was achieved in each state.

See also
Politics of Australia
History of Australia

References

 

! colspan="3" style="border-top: 5px solid #cccccc" | Amendments to the Constitution of Australia
|-
| style="width: 30%; text-align: center;" | 2nd amendment1st State Debts amendment (1910)

| style="width: 30%; text-align: center;" | 4th amendmentSocial services (1946)

Amendments to the Constitution of Australia
1929 in law
1928 referendums
Referendum
Constitutional referendums in Australia
November 1928 events